"A&W" is a song recorded by American singer-songwriter Lana Del Rey for her ninth studio album, Did You Know That There's a Tunnel Under Ocean Blvd (2023). It was written and produced by Del Rey, alongside Jack Antonoff. The song was released on February 14, 2023 as the album's second single.
The song's title references the American root beer brand of the same name, and serves as an initialism for "American Whore".

Composition
"A&W" was written and produced by Del Rey alongside Jack Antonoff. Described as a folk, trap, and pop ballad, the song is composed of two halves. The first half is folk-oriented, prominently featuring acoustic guitar. The second half, dubbed "Jimmy" by fans and critics, is trap-oriented, which Rolling Stone noted for "harkening back to some of her early hip-hop-inspired productions". The second melody takes on a more experimental beat for Del Rey. The song contains a reference to Down Down Baby, a nursery rhyme that has been used in various songs and media productions since the mid 20th century, including the 1959 R&B song "Shimmy, Shimmy, Ko-Ko-Bop" by Little Anthony and the Imperials. It drew further comparisons to the "Lizzy Grant era" of Del Rey's career (which describes unreleased songs, demos, and early recordings with a signature girl-ish, youthful timbre).

Release 
The song was released on Valentine's Day, February 14, 2023, as the album's second single. In an Instagram post announcing the album's title and release date, Antonoff teased the track, calling it his "favorite we've ever done."

Critical reception 
The song received acclaim from critics for its experimental production. Shaad D'Souza of Pitchfork named the song "Best New Track", lauding it as a "psychedelic, collagist freakout". Jon Blistein of Rolling Stone called it "classic Lana in every way imaginable", intertwining themes of "bad love" with "Americana symbolism. Ken Partridge of Genius described the song as a "complex character study", noting the lyrical references to other media, and the verse critiquing rape culture.

Personnel 
 Lana Del Rey – songwriting, producer, vocals
 Jack Antonoff – songwriting, producer
 Sam Dew – songwriting

Charts

References 

2020s ballads
2023 songs
2023 singles
American folk songs
Folk ballads
Lana Del Rey songs
Interscope Records singles
Polydor Records singles
Pop ballads
Psychedelic songs
Songs about drugs
Songs written by Lana Del Rey
Songs written by Jack Antonoff
Song recordings produced by Jack Antonoff
Song recordings produced by Lana Del Rey